The United Front Work Department of the Central Committee of the Chinese Communist Party (UFWD) is a department of the Central Committee of the Chinese Communist Party (CCP) which is officially tasked with "united front work". For this endeavor, it gathers intelligence on, manages relations with, and attempts to influence elite individuals and organizations inside and outside China, including in Hong Kong and Taiwan. The UFWD focuses its work on people or entities that are outside the CCP, especially in overseas Chinese communities, who hold political, commercial, or academic influence, or who represent interest groups. Through its efforts, the UFWD seeks to ensure that these individuals and groups are supportive of or useful to CCP interests and that potential critics remain divided.

History 
The United Front Work Department was created during the Chinese Civil War, and was reestablished in 1979 under paramount leader Deng Xiaoping. Since 2012, the role and scope of the UFWD has expanded and intensified under CCP general secretary Xi Jinping.

Civil war and gaining power

United front policies were most used in two periods before the Chinese Communist Revolution, namely from 1924 to 1927, and from 1936 to 1945, when the CCP cooperated with the Nationalist Party ostensibly to defeat the Japanese. The simplest formulation of UF work in the period was to "rally as many allies as possible in order to... defeat a common enemy."

In the early years the CCP also used United Front policies to cooperate with "disaffected warlords, religious believers, ethnic minorities, Overseas Chinese, and "minor parties and groups," that is front groups for the CCP to appear democratic.

The Party communist agitators were able to persuade "minor parties and groups" in China that the Nationalists were "illegitimate and repressive while the CCP embodied progress, unity, and democracy."

After seizing power the communists continued to deploy united front strategies to train new communist intellectuals, "and, using thought reform based on criticism, began the transformation of the old society intellectuals." This involved violent elimination of what were termed "bourgeois and idealistic political beliefs," to instil faith in "class struggle and revolutionary change." The CCP required the intellectuals to have "faith in class struggle and revolutionary change."

Reform-era
In the late 1970s the policy was used for the common cause of economic reform. From there the Party expanded the scope of its work internationally during the reform era, and again following the 1989 Tiananmen Square protests and massacre. The department includes a bureau tasked with handling Hong Kong, Macau, Taiwan, and overseas affairs, and articulates the importance of using overseas Chinese populations to promote unification. It played an important role in building support for "One country, two systems" in Hong Kong during the 1980s and 1990s, operating under the name of the "Coordination Department." The UFWD has been critically described as serving to co-opt non-Communist community leaders outside China, and "using them to neutralize Party critics," sometimes coercively.

Scholar of Chinese political history John P. Burns presents in his book The Chinese Communist Party's Nomenklatura System excerpts from internal party documents demonstrating the role of the UFWD. The UFWD is to "implement better the party's united front policy and to assess and understand patriotic personages in different fields... so that we can arrange for correct placements for them and fully mobilize and bring into play their positive role in the Four Modernizations and to accomplish the return of Taiwan to the motherland so as to fulfill the cause of uniting the whole country, and to carry forward and solidify the revolutionary, patriotic united front."

The UFWD was used in the early years of communist rule "to guarantee CCP oversight" over groups that were not directly associated with the Party and government. Those groups, including NGOs, were brought under the authority of the UFWD, whose job it was to “continuing to play its part in mobilizing and rallying the whole people in common struggle” after the Liberation in 1949. When the CCP "shifted its focus from the 'mass line' to 'class struggle', the real united front disappeared. While the United Front Department still existed, its duties of uniting with all forces for the 'common struggle' shifted mainly to serving the Party's leadership and 'consolidating the proletarian dictatorship'," according to Brookings Institution visiting fellow Zhang Ye. Based on their actions in Taiwan and elsewhere the United Front Work Department appears to be used as a cover to conduct intelligence operations against targets of interest to the CCP.

Structure
The UFWD is reported to have over 40,000 personnel and does not disclose its budget. It oversees and directs eight minor and subordinate political parties and the All-China Federation of Industry and Commerce. It historically maintained a close relationship with the now-absorbed State Administration for Religious Affairs, which has overseen the country's five officially sanctioned religious organizations. In 2018, the United Front Work Department went through a reorganization in which it absorbed the State Administration for Religious Affairs (SARA) and the Overseas Chinese Affairs Office (OCAO) to become two internal bureaus. As part of the "one institution with two names" system, the UFWD retains OCAO and SARA (also called National Religious Affairs Administration) as external nameplates. The UFWD has also taken a leading role in antireligious campaigns in China under the official pretense of "sinicizing religions."

The UFWD also directs the National Ethnic Affairs Commission. As such, the UFWD is China's main agency overseeing and managing ethnic, religious and overseas Chinese affairs. The UFWD plays an active role in the sinicization of ethnic and religious minorities, particularly in Tibet, Inner Mongolia and of the Uyghurs through the Xinjiang internment camps. In 2020, shortly after the commencement of the 2020 Inner Mongolia protests, the UFWD issued a communique that stressed the need for all ethnic minorities in China to use Standard Chinese.

The UFWD has thirteen subdivisions, including nine bureaux (局 jú) and four other units:
 General Office: Oversees the functioning of the department, including its finances, security, assets, and work with other government and Party bodies.
 Policy and Theory Research Office: Handles ideological and policy research, internal propaganda, and the drafting of important documents. Works with other government agencies to develop propaganda efforts abroad.
 First Bureau—Party Work Bureau (一局，党派工作局): Governs affairs related to the eight minor, non-Communist parties legally allowed to operate in China.
 Second Bureau—Minority and Religious Work Bureau (二局，民族工作局): Researches and recommends policy on minorities in the country, and liaises with other government agencies in their related work. Also supervises religious work.
 Third Bureau—Hong Kong, Macau and Taiwan United Front Work Bureau (三局，港澳台统战工作局): Coordinates and communicates with friendly figures in Hong Kong, Macau, and Taiwan.
 Fourth Bureau—Non-public Economic Work Bureau (四局，非公有制经济工作局): Coordinates with figures from the private sector.
 Fifth Bureau—Independent and Non-Party Intellectuals Work Bureau (五局，无党派、党外知识分子工作局): Liaises with intellectuals not formally affiliated with the Communist Party.
 Sixth Bureau—New Social Class Representatives Work Bureau (六局，新的社会阶层人士工作局): Focuses on the "new social class", i.e., the rising Chinese middle class.
 Seventh Bureau: Responsible for ethnic minority and religious work, particularly as it relates to Tibet.
 Eighth Bureau: Responsible for ethnic minority and religious work, particularly as it relates to Xinjiang.
 Ninth Bureau—Overseas Chinese Affairs General Bureau (，侨务综合局): Coordinates and communicates with friendly figures in overseas Chinese affairs. The UFWD's Ninth Bureau runs the China Overseas Friendship Association (COFA). COFA and the China Overseas Exchange Association (COEA) merged in 2019.
 Tenth Bureau—Overseas Chinese Affairs Bureau (，侨务事务局): Coordinates and communicates with friendly figures in overseas Chinese affairs.
 Eleventh Bureau—Religious Work General Bureau (十一局，宗教综合局): Researches and recommends policy on religious affairs in the country, and liaises with other government agencies in their related work.
 Twelfth Bureau—Religious Work Bureau (十二局，宗教业务局): Researches and recommends policy on religious affairs in the country, and liaises with other government agencies in their related work.
 Department Party Committee
 Retired Cadre Office: responsible for the welfare of retired employees of the department.

Internal and overseas operations

Alex Joske has noted that there is no clear distinction between domestic and overseas UFWD activity and often overlap between the two. Scholar Martin Thorley has described the UFWD as being able to call upon a "latent network" of civic, educational, and non-governmental groups and affiliated individuals internally and abroad for its political purposes, especially in times of crisis. For instance, the UFWD uses members of the Chinese People's Political Consultative Conference and other organizations to carry out influence-building activities, often covertly. Researchers from Stanford University's Internet Observatory and the Hoover Institution describe the United Front as "cultivat[ing] pro-Beijing perspectives in the Chinese diaspora and the wider world by rewarding those it deems friendly with accolades and lucrative opportunities, while orchestrating social and economic pressure against critics. This pressure is often intense but indirect, and clear attribution is therefore difficult."

The UFWD and its affiliated front organizations have also served as cover for intelligence agents of the Ministry of State Security. Multiple national intelligence agencies have expressed concern that the mandate and operations of the UFWD can constitute undue interference in other nations' internal affairs. In their book Nest of Spies, de Pierrebourg and Juneau-Katsuya allege that the United Front Work Department “manages important dossiers concerning foreign countries. These include propaganda, the control of Chinese students abroad, the recruiting of agents among the Chinese diaspora (and among sympathetic foreigners), and long-term clandestine operations.”

The Chinese People's Association for Friendship with Foreign Countries has been described as the "public face" of the UFWD. Scholar Jichang Lulu noted that the UFWD and its proxy organizations "re-purpose democratic governance structures to serve as tools of extraterritorial influence." An Atlantic writer stated China runs thousands of linked and subsidized pro-government groups across Europe, to "ensure that its overseas citizens, and others of ethnic Chinese descent, are loyal", to "shape the conversation about China in Europe", and to "bring back technology and expertise", and that the UFWD plays a "crucial" role in this project. Scholar Jeffrey Stoff has argued that the CPP's United Front "influence apparatus intersects with or directly supports its global technology transfer apparatus."

In March 2018, it was announced that the Overseas Chinese Affairs Office would be absorbed into the United Front Work Department. With the absorption of the Overseas Chinese Affairs Office, the UFWD gained full control of the country's second largest state-run media apparatus, the China News Service. In 2019, the UFWD partnered with the Cyberspace Administration of China to promote united front work with social media influencers.

In January 2020, UFWD-linked organizations in Canada and other countries were activated to purchase, stockpile, and export personal protective equipment in response to the COVID-19 pandemic in mainland China.

Foreign electoral interference 

The UFWD has also interfered in foreign elections, including the 2019 Canadian federal election. Following the 2019 Canadian Parliament infiltration plot, the Privy Council Office warned that election interference by China was "likely to be more persistent and pervasive in future elections" and that "the UFWD’s extensive network of quasi-official and local community and interest groups, allow it to obfuscate communication and the flow of funds between Canadian targets and Chinese officials."

Reaction 
A 2018 report by the United States-China Economic and Security Review Commission noted that the UFWD regularly attempts to suppress overseas protests and acts of expression critical of the CCP are a conspiracy against rights. In May 2020, the White House released a report titled "U.S. Strategic Approach to the People's Republic of China". That report stated that "CCP United Front organizations and agents target businesses, universities, think tanks, scholars, journalists, and local, state, and Federal officials in the United States and around the world, attempting to influence discourse and restrict external influence inside the PRC." In June 2020, the Australian Strategic Policy Institute issued a report advocating a multi-dimensional response involving law enforcement as well as legislative reform for greater transparency of foreign influence operations. The same month the Republican Study Committee in the United States called for sanctions on the UFWD and its top leadership. 

In January 2022, MI5 issued an "interference alert" for a solicitor in the UK named Christine Lee suspected of political interference on behalf of the UFWD. In a February 2022 ruling, a Canadian court stated that the UFWD's Overseas Chinese Affairs Office "engages in covert and surreptitious intelligence gathering”.

U.S. sanctions 

In December 2020, the United States Department of State imposed visa restrictions on "individuals active in United Front Work Department activities, who have engaged in the use or threat of physical violence, theft and release of private information, espionage, sabotage, or malicious interference in domestic political affairs, academic freedom, personal privacy, or business activity." In January 2021, the head of the UFWD, You Quan, was sanctioned pursuant to Executive Order 13936 as a Specially Designated National by United States Department of the Treasury's Office of Foreign Assets Control.

Department heads 
During two periods the United Front Work Department was without a leader, from 1966 to 1975 during the Cultural Revolution and from the end of 1989 until 22 November 1990 following the 1989 Tiananmen Square protests and massacre. The UFWD has had two female heads, Liu Yandong (2002–2007) and Sun Chunlan (2014–2017).

See also 

 United Front (China)
Chinese People's Political Consultative Conference
 Chinese Students and Scholars Association
 Confucius Institute
 List of political parties in the People's Republic of China

References

External links 

 

Institutions of the Central Committee of the Chinese Communist Party
Chinese propaganda organisations
Chinese intelligence agencies
Information operations units and formations
Disinformation operations
Working Dep
Technology transfer
One institution with multiple names
Chinese information operations and information warfare